The American Derby is a Thoroughbred horse race in the United States run annually at Arlington Park in Arlington Heights, Illinois. The inaugural American Derby was held at Chicago's old Washington Park Race Track on the city's South Side and raced there until 1905, when the facility was closed following the state's ban on gambling and horse racing and the track was demolished. 1893's American Derby was the 2nd richest race in the U.S. during the 19th century.

There was no racing in Chicago in 1895, 1896, 1897, 1899, and again in 1905 and 1906. The effect would be that the American Derby was not run from 1905 through 1925, except for 1916 when it was hosted by the Hawthorne Race Course in Stickney, Illinois.

Revived in 1926, it evolved to become one of the important events of the American racing season that drew some of the very best horses from all over the country. It was run at the new Washington Park Race Track in Homewood, Illinois in 1926 and 1927 and then was held at the Arlington Park course in 1928 before returning to the new Washington Park in 1929 where it remained through 1957. From 1958-2021 the race has been run at Arlington Park until its closure. In 2022, the race took place at Churchill Downs.

Since 1992 the American Derby has been run on turf. Previously, it had been raced on the turf course from 1955 through 1957 and from 1970 through 1976. Over the years, the distance has varied:

  miles: 1884–1904, 1926, 1927, 1958–1961, 1966–1974, 1976
 miles: 1928–1951, 1962–1965, 1977–1991
 miles: 1916, 1955–1957, 1992–2014
 miles: 1952–1954, 1958–1961, 1966–1974, 1976, 2015–2018
 miles: 1975, 2019–2021
1 mile: 1952–1954, 1958–1961

Most wins by a jockey:
 5 – Bill Shoemaker
 5 – Eddie Arcaro
 4 – Isaac Burns Murphy

Hall of Fame jockey George Woolf won the race three years in a row from 1942 to 1944.

Most wins by a trainer:
 3 – Horace A. Jones, Ben A. Jones, Dermot K. Weld, William I. Mott (2005, 2006, 2007)

Most wins by an owner:
 8 –  Calumet Farm
 4 – Lucky Baldwin

Winners

† Dead Head in 1984

†† Dead Heat in 1994

‡ In 1996, the first-place finisher Trail City was disqualified and placed second

Notes

External links
 Photo of 1916 American Derby at Hawthorne Race Course
Graded stakes races in the United States
Flat horse races for three-year-olds
1884 establishments in Illinois
Turf races in the United States
Recurring sporting events established in 1884
Arlington Park
Hawthorne Race Course
Horse races in Illinois